The Standard Bank of Canada was a Canadian bank established in 1873 as the St. Lawrence Bank by a group of Toronto businessmen led by John Charles Fitch.

In 1876 it was renamed the Standard Bank of Canada following a reorganization, and under its new management it grew. By 1907 it had nearly 50 branches and added another 27 when Standard Bank acquired the Western Bank of Canada (1882-1909), a regional bank headquartered in Oshawa, Ontario. The bank began to expand into the western provinces, and later combined with the Sterling Bank in 1924. The combined entity had 243 branches, of which 176 were in Ontario. Increased competition and other strategic considerations led to the Standard Bank of Canada to merge with the Canadian Bank of Commerce in 1928.

The Standard Bank of Canada issued its own banknotes, as many of Canada's banks did in that era.  Some examples of these notes can be seen at the Bank of Canada's Currency Museum.

See also

 List of banks and credit unions in Canada

References

CIBC - Mergers and Amalgamations, The Canadian Bank of Commerce

Defunct banks of Canada
Banks established in 1873
Banks disestablished in 1928
1873 establishments in Ontario
1928 disestablishments in Ontario